St. Andrew's Girls' College is a school in Central Province, Sri Lanka. It is situated in the Kandy District The school is located near Mahaweli Ganga, close to the Nawalapitiya Police station and in front of the Nawalapitiya railway station. It was the first school that was started in Nawalapitiya as a mixed school. It currently operates as a girls only school.

References 

Schools in Kandy District